Ghanshyam Singh Lodhi (born 6 May 1967) is an Indian politician who served as a Member of the Uttar Pradesh Legislative Council from 2004 to 2010 representing Rashtriya Kranti Party of Kalyan Singh and 2016 to 2022 representing the Samajwadi Party. He won Rampur Lok Sabha bypolls in 2022 representing the Bharatiya Janata Party

References 

|-

Uttar Pradesh politicians
Samajwadi Party politicians
Living people
Bharatiya Janata Party politicians from Uttar Pradesh
India MPs 2019–present
People from Rampur, Uttar Pradesh
1967 births